Rhophilin-1 is a protein that in humans is encoded by the RHPN1 gene.

References

Further reading